Ladrón is a Spanish-language name. Notable people with the name include:

Rafael Ladrón (born 1952), Spanish cyclist
Vela Ladrón (died 1174), Spanish nobleman
Ladrón Íñiguez (died 1155), nobleman of the Kingdom of Navarre

Music
 "Ladrón" (song) by Lali and Cazzu, 2020

See also
Ladrones (disambiguation)